Sandpoint (Kutenai language: kamanqukuⱡ) is the largest city in, and the county seat of, Bonner County, Idaho. Its population was 8,639 at the 2020 census.

Sandpoint's major economic contributors include forest products, light manufacturing, tourism, recreation and government services. As the largest service center in the two northern Idaho counties (Bonner and Boundary), as well as northwestern Montana, it has an active retail sector. It is the home of the headquarters of utility aircraft maker Quest Aircraft and salad dressing manufacturer Litehouse Foods.

Sandpoint lies on the shores of Idaho's largest lake, 43-mile-long Lake Pend Oreille, and is surrounded by three major mountain ranges, the Selkirk, Cabinet and Bitterroot ranges. It is home to Schweitzer Mountain Resort, Idaho's largest ski resort, and is on the International Selkirk Loop and two National Scenic Byways (Wild Horse Trail and Pend Oreille Scenic Byway). Among other distinctions awarded by national media in the past decade, in 2011 Sandpoint was named the nation's "Most Beautiful Small Town" by Rand McNally and USA Today.

History

Salish Tribes, specifically the Kalispel, and the Kootenai, built encampments on the shore of Lake Pend Oreille every summer, fished, made baskets of cedar, and collected huckleberries before returning to either Montana or Washington in the fall. The encampments ended before 1930.

The region was extensively explored by David Thompson of the North West Company starting in 1807. Disputed joint British/American occupation of the Columbia District led to the Oregon boundary dispute. This controversy ended in 1846 with the signing of the Oregon Treaty, whereby Britain ceded all rights to land south of the 49th parallel.

In the 1880s, the Northern Pacific Railroad brought European and Chinese settlement to the area.

In August 1888, 29-year-old author and civil servant Theodore Roosevelt visited Sandpoint on a caribou-hunting trip in the Selkirk Mountains. Roosevelt documented what a rough-and-tumble environment "Sand Point" was at that time (and for many decades following).

Sandpoint was officially incorporated in 1898.

Timber harvesting and railroads drove the economy for nearly a century as loggers moved in from the over-harvested Great Lakes region. Several lumber companies operated in the region from as early as 1896 to present, the most notable being the Humbird Lumber Company which operated from 1900 to around 1944. The lumber companies bought land from the Northern Pacific Railroad and built a major mill at Sandpoint and adjacent Kootenai. Lumber company-owned railroads extended into many of the local drainages including Grouse Creek, Gold Creek and Rapid Lightning Creek. Although the trees were never exhausted in the area, Humbird Lumber succumbed to the low timber prices of the Great Depression.

"Stump ranches" were sold by Humbird to many families who slowly cleared much of the valley land of tree stumps. Farming and ranching became the third largest business in the area, behind lumber and railroads, prior to the "discovery" of Lake Pend Oreille as a sports fishery in the 1950s. The economy was given a boost during World War II from Farragut Naval Station, a training center for the US Navy located at the southwestern end of Lake Pend Oreille.

The opening of Schweitzer Mountain Resort in 1963 turned the area into a year-round tourism destination. The beauty of the surrounding Selkirk and Cabinet Mountains and Lake Pend Oreille has kept Sandpoint a tourist favorite for water sports, hunting, hiking, horseback riding, fishing and skiing.

In the 1980s and 1990s, 30 miles south of Sandpoint, the areas of Coeur d'Alene and Hayden Lake attracted nationwide publicity when white supremacist Neo-Nazi groups (most notably the Aryan Nations) set up headquarters in the area. Many Sandpoint residents reacted negatively to such groups; some formed the Bonner County Human Rights Task Force in opposition. In 2001, the Aryan Nations lost a lawsuit filed against them. The lawsuit bankrupted the organization and forced them to give up their Hayden Lake property and disband. In December 2011, Sandpoint became the first city in Idaho to pass an ordinance prohibiting discrimination in housing, employment and public accommodations based on sexual orientation or gender identity.

Community organizations stage a number of regionally known annual events, including Sandpoint Winter Carnival in February; the Lost in the 50s vintage car show in May; and the Festival at Sandpoint summer music festival in August. Sandpoint's historic vaudeville-era Panida Theater hosts frequent performing art events and an ongoing independent film series. The Music Conservatory of Sandpoint provides classical music classes and inaugurated its "Little Carnegie" concert hall in 2022. A robust visual arts community supported by the Pend Oreille Arts Council also contributes to Sandpoint's reputation as a center for arts and culture in northern Idaho and the Inland Northwest.

Geography and climate

Sandpoint has a fairly typical inland Northwestern humid continental climate (Köppen Dsb), with cold, snowy winters and dry summers with large diurnal temperature swings from hot in the day to very cool at night.

Demographics

The median income between 2016 and 2020 for a household in the city was $46,712. The per capita income for the city was $28,210. The percentage of persons below the poverty line (2016–2020) was 14.7%.

The median value of owner-occupied housing in the city was $228,800. The homeownership rate (2006–2010) was 49.6%.

Of the population over 25 years of age (2006–2010), 89.9% had graduated high school, 25.6% had achieved a bachelor's degree or higher.

2010 census
As of the census of 2010, there were 7,365 people, 3,215 households, and 1,811 families residing in the city. The racial makeup of the city was 95.5% White, 0.1% African American, 0.7% Native American, 0.8% Asian, 0.5% from other races, and 2.2% from two or more races. Hispanic or Latino of any race were 2.9% of the population.

There were 3,215 households, of which 29.3% had children under the age of 18 living with them, 39.4% were married couples living together, 12.3% had a female householder with no husband present, 4.7% had a male householder with no wife present, and 43.7% were non-families. 36.3% of all households were made up of individuals, and 15.1% had someone living alone who was 65 years of age or older. The average household size was 2.20 and the average family size was 2.86.

The median age in the city was 38.8 years. 23.3% of residents were under the age of 18; 8.1% were between the ages of 18 and 24; 26.2% were from 25 to 44; 25.9% were from 45 to 64; and 16.7% were 65 years of age or older. The gender makeup of the city was 48.2% male and 51.8% female.

Politics

Economy
Since 2002, Sandpoint has been home to aircraft manufacturer Quest Aircraft.

Education

Sandpoint is part of the Lake Pend Oreille School District. Sandpoint High School and Lake Pend Oreille Alternative High School educate students in grades 9 through 12.

Forrest Bird Charter School educates grades 6–12.

Rail transportation

The Sandpoint Amtrak station serves as the only stop in Idaho. The Amtrak Empire Builder route carries passengers daily  in both directions between Chicago, Illinois to the east and Seattle, Washington and Portland, Oregon to the west.

Local media
Radio
 KSPT AM 1400 (News/Talk)
 KRFY FM 88.5 (Alternative)
 KPND FM 95.3 (Adult Hits)
 KTAQ-LP FM 97.7 (3ABN Radio)
 KIBR FM 102.5 (Country music)
 KTPO FM 106.7 (KPND 95.3 repeater)
 FM 105.3 (Sandpoint's Hit Music)

Television
Television stations serving Sandpoint originate from the Spokane, Washington market:
 KREM 2 (CBS)
 KXLY-TV 4 (ABC)
 KHQ-TV 6 (NBC)
 KSPS-TV 7 (PBS)

Print
 The Bonner County Daily Bee, daily paper since 1965
 The Sandpoint Reader, weekly paper since 2004

Notable people

 Forrest Bird, aviator, biomedical inventor, recipient of Presidential Citizens Medal
 Allie Brosh, humorist blogger and novelist
 Leon Cadore, baseball pitcher who pitched a 26-inning game in 1920, graduate of Sandpoint High School
 John Craigie, folk singer, lived there for a summer and wrote the song "All of July" about Sandpoint
 James C. Fry, United States Army major general, recipient of Distinguished Service Cross
 Mark Fuhrman, former LAPD detective primarily known for his role in the O. J. Simpson murder case
 Tinker Hatfield, athletic shoe designer and Nike Air Jordan architect
 Nate Holland, two-time Olympian, five-time X Games gold medalist, US Snowboard team
 Nell Kruegel Irion, city councilor and first woman to run for Congress in Idaho
 Jerry Kramer, National Football League right guard, author
 Joe Mather, Major League Baseball outfielder
 Patrick F. McManus, outdoor writer and humorist
 Viggo Mortensen, actor and producer
 Don Osborn, former minor league baseball pitcher and manager and pitching coach for the Pittsburgh Pirates
 Kristy Osmunson, singer and fiddle player of the country music duo Bomshel
 Sarah Palin, former governor of Alaska and 2008 Republican nominee for Vice President
Genevieve Pezet (1913–2009), American artist who lived in France.
 Jake Plummer, former NFL quarterback
 Shook Twins, folk music duo who grew up in Sandpoint
 Lucy Ann Polk, big-band singer
 Marilynne Robinson, writer and winner of the 2005 Pulitzer Prize for Fiction
 Jake Rosholt, mixed martial artist and former collegiate wrestler at Oklahoma State
 Don Samuelson, 25th Governor of Idaho (1967−1971)
 Edgar Steele, attorney found guilty of a murder-for-hire plot (from the nearby town of Sagle)
 Ben Stein , writer, lawyer, actor, comedian, and commentator on political and economic issues
 Tim Thomas, retired National Hockey League goaltender

References

Further reading
 
 Edward S. Curtis, The North American Indian, Northwestern University, Digital Library Collections, "Kalispel", Page 51

External links

 City website
 Bonner County Profile from the Idaho Department of Labor

 
Cities in Bonner County, Idaho
County seats in Idaho
Populated places established in 1898
1898 establishments in Idaho
Cities in Idaho